The modified  KdV–Burgers equation is a nonlinear partial differential equation

See also
Burgers' equation
Korteweg–de Vries equation
modified KdV equation

References

Graham W. Griffiths William E. Shiesser Traveling Wave Analysis of Partial Differential Equations Academy Press
 Richard H. Enns George C. McCGuire, Nonlinear Physics Birkhauser,1997
Inna Shingareva, Carlos Lizárraga-Celaya,Solving Nonlinear Partial Differential Equations with Maple Springer.
Eryk Infeld and George Rowlands, Nonlinear Waves, Solitons and Chaos,Cambridge 2000
Saber Elaydi,An Introduction to Difference Equationns, Springer 2000
Dongming Wang, Elimination Practice, Imperial College Press 2004
 David Betounes, Partial Differential Equations for Computational Science: With Maple and Vector Analysis Springer, 1998 
 George Articolo Partial Differential Equations and Boundary Value Problems with Maple V Academic Press 1998 

Nonlinear partial differential equations